is a Paralympian athlete from Japan competing mainly in throwing events.

Kyoko competed in the 2004 Summer Paralympics in Athens where she won a silver in the F32-34/51-53 discus as well as competing in the F32-34/452/53 shot put.

References

Paralympic athletes of Japan
Athletes (track and field) at the 2004 Summer Paralympics
Paralympic silver medalists for Japan
Living people
Medalists at the 2004 Summer Paralympics
Year of birth missing (living people)
Paralympic medalists in athletics (track and field)
Japanese female discus throwers
Japanese female shot putters
21st-century Japanese women